Raleigh Academy, also Raleigh Male Academy for a period after the American Civil War, was a prominent school in Raleigh, North Carolina that lasted about 80 years until a governor's mansion (North Carolina Executive Mansion) took over its site. It opened in 1801.

North Carolina College of Agriculture and Mechanic Arts (a predecessor of NC State) played its first football game against Raleigh Male Academy on March 12, 1892, in what is now Pullen Park.

Notable alumni
William Henry Haywood Jr., former U.S. senator from the state of North Carolina
John McKee, American football coach and physician
Rufus Lenoir Patterson, businessman and politician

See also
William Peace University

References

Schools in Raleigh, North Carolina